Jangipur subdivision is an administrative subdivision of Murshidabad district in the state of West Bengal, India.

Overview
The Bhagirathi River splits the district into two natural physiographic regions – Rarh on the west and Bagri on the east. Jangipur subdivision lies in the Rarh region in Murshidabad district. The Rarh region spreads over from the adjoining Santhal Pargana division of Jharkhand on the west. The land is slightly higher in altitude than the surrounding plains and is undulating. The Padma River, on the east, separates Murshidabad district from Malda district and Chapai Nawabganj and Rajshahi districts of Bangladesh in the north.

Geography

Subdivisions
Murshidabad district is divided into the following administrative subdivisions:

Administrative units
Jangipur subdivision has 5 police stations, 7 community development blocks, 7 panchayat samitis, 61 gram panchayats, 561 mouzas, 420 inhabited villages, 2 municipalities and 52 census towns. The municipalities are: Jangipur and Dhulian. The census towns are: Farakka Barrage Township, Srimantapur (P), Benia Gram, Arjunpur, Sibnagar, Memrejpur, Pranpara, Mahadebnagar, Anup Nagar, Jaffrabad, Kankuria, Uttar Mahammadpur, Chachanda, Dhusaripara, Serpur, Kohetpur, Bhasaipaikar, Jaykrishnapur, Basudebpur, Madna, Ramakantapur, Nayabahadurpur, Fatellapur, Jagtaj, Debipur, Aurangabad, Mahendrapur, Hafania, Dafahat, Paschim Punropara, Ichhlampur, Chakmeghoan, Kakramari, Khanpur, Khidirpur, Bhabki, Ghorsala, Srikantabati, Charka, Dafarpur, Ramnagar, Mirzapur, Giria, Mithipur, Jot Kamal, Osmanpur, Sahajadpur, Khodarampur, Donalia, Teghari, Krishna Sali and Bara Jumla. The subdivision has its headquarters at Jangipur.

Note: The two maps present some of the notable locations in the subdivision. All places marked in the maps are linked in the larger full screen maps.

Police stations
Murshidabad district is divided into two police districts. Jangipur subdivision with seven blocks is under Jangipur police district for law and order purposes.

Police stations in Jangipur subdivision have the following features and jurisdiction:

Murshidabad district has a 125.35 km long international border with Bangladesh of which 42.35 km is on land and the remaining is riverine.

There are reports of Bangladeshi infiltrators entering Murshidabad district. An estimate made in 2000 places the total number of illegal Bangladeshi immigrants in India at 1.5 crore, with around 3 lakh entering every year. The thumb rule for such illegal immigrants is that for each illegal person caught four get through. While many immigrants have settled in the border areas, some have moved on, even to far way places such as Mumbai and Delhi. The border is guarded by the Border Security Force. During the UPA government, Sriprakash Jaiswal, Union Minister of State for Home Affairs, had made a statement in Parliament on 14 July 2004, that there were 12 million illegal Bangladeshi infiltrators living in India, and West Bengal topped the list with 5.7 million Bangladeshis. More recently, Kiren Rijiju, Minister of State for Home Affairs in the NDA government has put the figure at around 20 million. Critics point out that the Bengali politicians, particularly those from the ruling Trinamool Congress and the CPI (M), believe that a soft approach to the problem helps them to win Muslim votes.

Gram Panchayats
The subdivision contains 61 gram panchayats under 7 community development blocks:

 Raghunathganj I CD Block - Dafarpur, Jarur, Mirjapur, Jamuar, Kanupur and Raninagar.
 Raghunathganj II CD Block - Barasimul Dayarampur, Jotkamal, Mitipur, Sekendra, Kasiadanga, Sammatinagar, Teghari–I, Giria, Lakshmijola and Sekalipur.
 Suti I CD Block - Ahiran, Bansabati, Nurpur, Bahutali, Harua and Sadikpur.
 Suti II CD Block - Aurangabad–I, Jagtai–I, Laxmipur, Umrapur, Aurangabad–II, Jagtai–II, Mahesail–I, Bajitpur, Kasimnagar, Mahesail–II.
 Samserganj CD Block - Bogdadnagar, Gajinagar Malancha, Nimtita, Bhasaipaikar, Chachanda, Pratapganj, Dogachhi Napara, Kanchantala and Tinpukuria.
 Sagardighi CD Block - Balia, Bokhara–I, Kabilpur, Patkeldanga, Bannyeswar, Bokhara–II, Monigram, Sagardighi, Barala, Gobordhandanga and Moregram.
 Farakka CD Blocks - Arjunpur, Bewa–I, Mahadebnagar, Bahadurpur, Bewa–II, Maheshpur, Beniagram, Imamnagar and Nayansukh.

Blocks
Community development blocks in Jangipur subdivision are:

River bank erosion
As of 2013, an estimated 2.4 million people reside along the banks of the Ganges alone in Murshidabad district. The main channel of the Ganges has a bankline of 94 km along its right bank from downstream of Farakka Barrage to Jalangi. Severe erosion occurs all along this bank. The encroaching river wiped out 50 mouzas and engulfed about 10,000 hectares of fertile land. The following blocks have to face the brunt of erosion year after year: Farakka, Samserganj, Suti I, Suti II, Raghunathganj II, Lalgola, Bhagawangola I, Bhagawangola II, Raninagar I, Raninagar II and Jalangi. As per official estimate, till 1992-94 more than 10,000 hectares of chars (flood plain sediment island) have developed in main places, which have become inaccessible from the Indian side but can be reached easily from Bangladesh.

See also - River bank erosion along the Ganges in Malda and Murshidabad districts

Economy

Infrastructure
All inhabited villages in Murshidabad district have power supply.

See the individual block pages for more information about the infrastructure available.

Farakka Barrage
Farakka Barrage Project Complex comprises the 2,245 m long Farakka Barrage across the Ganges, the 213 m long Jangipur Barrage across the Bhagirathi, the 38.38 km long Feeder Canal, 33.79 km long Left Afflux Bund of Farakka Barrage and 16.31 km long Left Afflux Bund of Jangipur Barrage, Anti-erosion Protection Work from Rajmahal and Diara (40 km upstream of Farakka Barrage) to Jalangi (80 km downstream from Farakka Barrage) and associated work. Farakka Barrage carries a rail-cum-road bridge. One of the largest projects of its kind in the country, it is under the Union Ministry of Water Resources, River Development & Ganga Rejuvenation.

Power stations
The 2,100 MW Farakka Super Thermal Power Station of NTPC at Nabarun and the 1,600 MW Sagardighi Thermal Power Station of West Bengal Power Development Corporation, at Manigram, are in Jangipur subdivision.

Beedi industry
According to a 2016 report, there are around 1,000,000 (1 million/ ten lakh) workers engaged in the beedi industry in Jangipur subdivision. 90% are home-based and 70% of the home-based workers are women. There are around 90 registered manufacturers of major biri brands in West Bengal, the nerve centre being Jangipur subdivision. There are 18 big factories and 50 small factories in this subdivision. The munshi, a contractor, who distributes the raw materials to the homes of workers and collects the finished products, is a key figure. As of 2003, around 400,000 workers were engaged in the prime area locations of beedi making, a household industry, in Farakka, Samserganj, Suti I, Suti II, Raghunathganj I and Raghunathganj II CD Blocks of Jangipur subdivision. The majority of those working were women and children.

Agriculture
Murshidabad is a predominantly agricultural district. A majority of the population depends on agriculture for a living. The land is fertile. The eastern portion of the Bhagirathi, an alluvial tract, is very fertile for growing Aus paddy, jute and rabi crops. The Kalantar area in the south-eastern portion of the district, is a low-lying area with stiff dark clay and supports mainly the cultivation of Aman paddy. The west flank of the Bhagirathi is a lateritic tract intersected by numerous bils and old river beds. It supports the cultivation of Aman paddy, sugar cane and mulberry.

Given below is an overview of the agricultural production (all data in tonnes) for Jangipur subdivision, other subdivisions and the Murshidabad district, with data for the year 2013-14.

Education
Murshidabad district had a literacy rate of 66.59% (for population of 7 years and above) as per the census of India 2011. Barhampur subdivision had a literacy rate of 72.60%, Kandi subdivision 66.28%, Jangipur subdivision 60.95%, Lalbag subdivision 68.00% and Domkal subdivision 68.35%.

Given in the table below (data in numbers) is a comprehensive picture of the education scenario in Murshidabad district for the year 2013-14:

Note: Primary schools include junior basic schools; middle schools, high schools and higher secondary schools include madrasahs; technical schools include junior technical schools, junior government polytechnics, industrial technical institutes, industrial training centres, nursing training institutes etc.; technical and professional colleges include engineering colleges, medical colleges, para-medical institutes, management colleges, teachers training and nursing training colleges, law colleges, art colleges, music colleges etc. Special and non-formal education centres include sishu siksha kendras, madhyamik siksha kendras, centres of Rabindra mukta vidyalaya, recognised Sanskrit tols, institutions for the blind and other handicapped persons, Anganwadi centres, reformatory schools etc.

The following institutions are located in Jangipur subdivision:
The Murshidabad Centre of Aligarh Muslim University was established at Village & PO Jangipur Barrage, PS Suti in 2010. It started classes for the 2-years Master of Business Administration (MBA) and the 5-years BA LLB programmes in 2011. It started B.Ed. in 2013.
Management Development Institute, Murshidabad, was established at Sakim Katnai, Kutori, PO Uttar Ramna, PS Raghunathganj. MDI, Murshidabad campus was inaugurated by Pranab Mukherjee, President of India, in 2014. It offers a residential post-graduate programme in management.
Jangipur College was established in 1950 at Jangipur.
Prof. Sayed Nurul Hasan College was established in 1994 at Farakka, It is named after Saiyid Nurul Hasan, historian and former governor of West Bengal.
Nur Mohammad Smriti Mahavidyalaya was established in 2008 at Dhulian.
Dukhulal Nibaran Chandra College was established in 1967 at Aurangabad.
Sagardighi Kamada Kinkar Smriti Mahavidyalaya was established in 2008 at Sagardighi.
Sagardighi Teachers’ Training College was established at Manigram in 2009.

Healthcare
The table below (all data in numbers) presents an overview of the medical facilities available and patients treated in the hospitals, health centres and sub-centres in 2014 in Murshidabad district.
 

.* Excluding nursing homes

Medical facilities in Jangipur subdivision are as follows:

Hospitals: (Name, location, beds)
Jangipur Subdivisional Hospital, Jangipur, 250 beds
Central Hospital for Beedi Workers, Malancha, Samserganj CD Block, 50 beds
Farakka Barrage Hospital, Farakka, 50 beds

Rural Hospitals: (Name, block, location, beds)
Sagardighi Rural Hospital, Sagardighi CD Block, Sagardighi, 30 beds
Anupnagar Rural Hospital, Samseganj CD Block, Dhulian, 30 beds
Mahesail Rural Hospital, Suti II CD Block, Mahesail, Parulia via Auragabad, 30 beds

Block Primary Health Centres: (Name, block, location, beds)
Farakka BPHC, Farakka CD Block, Farakka, 10 beds
Ahiran BPHC, Suti I CD Block, Ahiran, 15 beds
Rajnagar BPHC, Raghunathganj I CD Block, Rajnagar, 6 beds
Teghari BPHC, Raghunathganj II CD Block, Teghari, 10 beds

Primary Health Centres: (CD Block-wise)(CD Block, PHC location, beds)
Sagardighi CD Block: Monigram (10), Singeswari-Gouripur (6), Suryapur, Dhanparganj (4)
Farakka CD Block: Benipur (working as BPHC) (15), Arjunpur (10), Kendua, Srimantapur (2)
Samserganj CD Block: Putimari (2), Uttar Mahammadpur (10)
Suti I CD Block: Bahutali (10), Hilora (10)
Suti II CD Block: Aurangabad, Dafahat (10), Baje Gajipur, Kassimnagar (6)
Raghunathganj I CD Block: Barla (10), Gankar (2)
Raghunathganj II CD Block: Mohammadpur, Adikantapur (10)

Electoral constituencies
Lok Sabha (parliamentary) and Vidhan Sabha (state assembly) constituencies in Jangipur subdivision were as follows:

References

Subdivisions of West Bengal
Subdivisions in Murshidabad district